World Series Baseball '96 is a video game developed by Blue Sky Software and published by Sega for the Genesis in 1996.

Gameplay
World Series Baseball '96 is a baseball game featuring Blue Sky's engine with updates for the players.

Reception
Next Generation reviewed the Genesis version of the game, rating it four stars out of five, and stated that "What's certain is that Genesis isn't likely to have another baseball game of this quality ever.  At the very least, this is a must have for baseball fans who are saddled with a Genesis and a long summer without basketball or football."

Reviews
Electronic Gaming Monthly (Aug, 1996)
The Video Game Critic

References

1996 video games
Sega Genesis games
Video games developed in the United States
Video games scored by Sam Powell
Windows games
World Series Baseball video games